In cryptography, the term ciphertext expansion refers to the length increase of a message when it is encrypted. Many modern cryptosystems cause some degree of expansion during the encryption process, for instance when the resulting ciphertext must include a message-unique Initialization Vector (IV).  Probabilistic encryption schemes cause ciphertext expansion, as the set of possible ciphertexts is necessarily greater than the set of input plaintexts.  Certain schemes, such as Cocks Identity Based Encryption, or the Goldwasser-Micali cryptosystem result in ciphertexts hundreds or thousands of times longer than the plaintext.

Ciphertext expansion may be offset or increased by other processes which compress or expand the message, e.g., data compression or error correction coding.

References

Cryptography